Rowdy is an American documentary film about the NASCAR career of Kyle Busch. It premiered at Regal Opry Mills on June 23, 2022. It was later acquired by Amazon and premiered on Amazon Freevee on February 3, 2023.

Summary
The film covers the NASCAR career of Kyle Busch. It includes his reaction to the death of his friend and confidant Ricky Hendrick in the 2004 Hendrick Motorsports aircraft crash, and explores his relationship with his older brother Kurt Busch and his rivalry with Dale Earnhardt Jr.. It looks at his 2015 season, which began with a crash at Daytona International Speedway that required extensive rehabilitation, and ended with his first championship win at the 2015 NASCAR Sprint Cup Series. It features interviews with Kurt Busch, his wife Samantha Busch, Dale Earnhardt Jr, Jeff Gordon, Rick Hendrick, Joe Gibbs, and Marty Smith.

Cast
 Kyle Busch
 Dale Earnhardt Jr.
 Kurt Busch
 Samantha Busch
 Brexton Busch
 Tom Busch
 Gaye Busch
 Jamie Little
 Jeff Gordon
 Rick Hendrick
 Joe Gibbs
 Marty Smith
 Derek Daugherty
 Cody Little

Production
The film was produced by Chance Wright, the owner of Wright Productions, along with Venture 10 Studio Group, in collaboration with NASCAR Productions. When Wright proposed the documentary, Busch initially said no, before eventually agreeing to the film.

Release
The film premiered at Regal Opry Mills on June 23, 2022, prior to that weekend's Ally 400 at Nashville Superspeedway, and was shown in theaters on June 29 for one night only. It premiered on Amazon Freevee on February 3, 2023.

References

External links 
 

2022 films
2022 documentary films
American auto racing films
Documentary films about auto racing
Documentary films about sportspeople
NASCAR mass media
2020s English-language films
Kyle Busch
2020s American films